Enviva is the world’s largest producer of wood pellets, a renewable alternative to coal.  The company has also been the subject of controversy regarding its sustainability with an environmental group's analysis suggesting Enviva is responsible for 50 acres a day of clear-cut land and significantly increased CO2 production compared to coal per megawatt-hour. 

Enviva was founded in 2004, conducted an initial public offering in 2015, and is traded on the New York Stock Exchange under EVA. 

Enviva has 5 corporate offices worldwide, operates 9 pellet plants in 6 states of the Southeast United States, employs 1,200 associates, and ships wood pellets worldwide from 5 terminal facilities in the United States.

Leadership 

 John Keppler, Chairman and Chief Executive Officer
 Shai Even, Executive Vice President and Chief Financial Officer
 William Schmidt, Executive Vice President, Corporate Development & General Counsel
 Thomas Meth, Executive Vice President, Sales & Marketing
 Royal Smith, Executive Vice President, Operations
 Joseph ‘Nic” Lane, Executive Vice President, Human Capital
 Yana Kravtsova, Executive Vice President, Communications, Public & Environmental Affairs
 Norb Hintz, Senior Vice President and Chief Engineer
John-Paul Taylor, Senior Vice President, Optimization & Origination Marketing
 Dr. Jennifer Jenkins, Vice President and Chief Sustainability Officer
Chris Seifert, Vice President, EHS & Operations
Wushuang Ma, Vice President and Treasurer
Kate Walsh, Vice President, Investor Relations
 Chaminda Wijetilleke, Vice President, Strategy and Integration
 Oscar Young, Vice President and Corporate Controller
 James Geraghty, Vice President, Operations Finance
Jens Wolf, Vice President, Commercial, General Manager Europe
Craig Lorraine, Vice President, Customer Fulfillment

Facilities

Corporate Offices  
 Bethesda, Maryland (Headquarters)
 Berlin, Germany
 Raleigh, North Carolina
 Tokyo, Japan
 York, UK

Wood pellet plants 

 Ahoskie, North Carolina
 Amory, Mississippi
 Cottondale, Florida
 Greenwood, South Carolina
 Hamlet, North Carolina
 Northampton County, North Carolina
 Sampson County, North Carolina
 Southampton County, Virginia
 Waycross, Georgia

New planned wood pellet plants 

 Epes, Alabama
 Lucedale, Mississippi

Ports 

 Port of Chesapeake, Virginia
 Port of Mobile, Alabama
 Port of Panama City, Florida
 Port of Savannah, Georgia
 Port of Wilmington, North Carolina

New planned port 

 Port of Pascagoula, Mississippi (Under construction)

References 

Biomass
Manufacturing companies based in Maryland
Companies listed on the New York Stock Exchange